The 2017–18 Serie A1 was the 73rd season of the highest professional Italian Women's Volleyball League. The season took place from October to May, and was contested by twelve teams.

Format
The regular season consists of 22 rounds, where the twelve participating teams play each other twice (once home and once away). At the completion of the regular season, the eight best teams advance to the playoffs and the teams finishing in 11th and 12th are relegated to Serie A2.

The standings criteria are:
highest number of result points (points awarded for results: 3 points for 3–0 or 3–1 wins, 2 points for 3–2 win, 1 point for 2–3 loss);
highest number of matches won;
highest set quotient (the number of total sets won divided by the number of total sets lost);
highest points quotient (the number of total points scored divided by the number of total points conceded).

Teams

Regular season

League table

Results table

Fixtures and results
 All times are local, CEST (UTC+02:00) between 14 and 28 October 2017 and CET (UTC+01:00) from 29 October.

Round 1

Round 2

Round 3

Round 4

Round 5

Round 6

Round 7

Round 8

Round 9

Round 10

Round 11

Round 12

Round 13

Round 14

Round 15

Round 16

Round 17

Round 18

Round 19

Round 20

Round 21

Round 22

Playoffs

Bracket

Quarterfinals

(1) Igor Gorgonzola Novara vs. (8) Il Bisonte Firenze

Igor Gorgonzola Novara wins series, 2–0.

(4) Unet E-Work Busto Arsizio vs. (5) Saugella Team Monza

Unet E-Work Busto Arsizio wins series, 2–1.

(3) Imoco Volley Conegliano vs. (6) Liu Jo Nordmeccanica Modena

Imoco Volley Conegliano wins series, 2–0.

(2) Savino Del Bene Scandicci vs. (7) myCicero Volley Pesaro

Savino Del Bene Scandicci wins series, 2–0.

Semifinals

(1) Igor Gorgonzola Novara vs. (4) Unet E-Work Busto Arsizio

Igor Gorgonzola Novara wins series, 3–0.

(2) Savino Del Bene Scandicci vs. (3) Imoco Volley Conegliano

Imoco Volley Conegliano wins series, 3–0.

Finals

(1) Igor Gorgonzola Novara vs. (3) Imoco Volley Conegliano

Imoco Volley Conegliano wins series, 3–1.

Final standings

References

External links
 Official website 

2017-18
Italy, women
Italy Serie A1
Italy Serie A1
Volleyball
Volleyball